Albert Francis Grenert (July 8, 1919 – August 9, 2002) was an American professional basketball player and college coach. He played for the Sheboygan Red Skins and Tri-Cities Blackhawks in the National Basketball League, among other teams and leagues. He played college basketball and baseball at New York University (NYU). 

Grenert served in the U.S. Marine Corps during World War II. He also had a coaching career that lasted 30 seasons, spanning both college and high school levels.

References

1919 births
2002 deaths
American men's basketball coaches
American men's basketball players
Basketball coaches from Massachusetts
Basketball players from Massachusetts
College men's basketball head coaches in the United States
Forwards (basketball)
Guards (basketball)
High school basketball coaches in the United States
NYU Violets baseball players
NYU Violets men's basketball players
Sportspeople from Holyoke, Massachusetts
Professional Basketball League of America players
Saint Anselm Hawks men's basketball coaches
Scranton Miners players
Sheboygan Red Skins players
Tri-Cities Blackhawks players
United States Marine Corps personnel of World War II